Emmy Heim (Emilie Heim; 10 September 1885 – 13 October 1954) was an Austrian soprano singer and voice teacher. In her later career she lived in England and Canada.

Life

Early life and career
Heim was born in Vienna in 1885. She studied singing there with her mother and with Frances Mütter. She made her debut in 1911 at the Bösendorfer-Saal, and became well known as a concert singer in Austria, appearing many times at the Wiener Konzerthaus, and making tours in Germany, France and Switzerland.

She performed songs by Franz Schubert and Robert Schumann, and also sang contemporary works by Arnold Schoenberg, Alban Berg and others. In 1915 she gave the first performance of Schoenberg's songs "Waldsonne" (Op. 2 No. 4) and "Verlassen" (Op. 6 No. 4). She sang in large orchestral works, and took part in Schoenberg's Society for Private Musical Performances in 1919.

In 1915 Heim married the writer ; through him she met well known writers including Rainer Maria Rilke and Hugo von Hofmannsthal. In 1916 Oskar Kokoschka made a lithograph of her.

In 1921 she married the architect . They separated after a few years of marriage. They had a son, Michael; two further children died in childhood.

In England and Canada
Heim made her debut in England in 1929, and moved to London in the early 1930s. She oocasionally returned to Vienna to give recitals; she also maintained a singing studio in Salzburg where she taught during summers.

In 1934, visiting her brother in Canada, she met Sir Ernest MacMillan, which led to an informal concert, and a subsequent concert debut at Hart House Theatre in Toronto later that year. She then spent a few months each year in Canada until 1939, teaching and giving recitals.

During the Second World War she lived in England. She sang at Red Cross hospitals and in military camps; she gave concert recitals in London and was a guest lecturer at Oxford and Cambridge Universities. After the war she moved to Canada, and taught at the Royal Conservatory of Music in Toronto. Her pupils included Frances James, Jan Simons and Lois Marshall. Heim died in Toronto in 1954.

References

1885 births
1954 deaths
Musicians from Vienna
Austrian sopranos
Voice teachers
Austrian expatriates in the United Kingdom
Austrian expatriates in Canada